In algebraic topology, an -object (also called a symmetric sequence) is a sequence  of objects such that each  comes with an action of the symmetric group .

The category of combinatorial species is equivalent to the category of finite -sets (roughly because the permutation category is equivalent to the category of finite sets and bijections.)

S-module 
By -module, we mean an -object in the category  of finite-dimensional vector spaces over a field k of characteristic zero (the symmetric groups act from the right by convention).

This definition of -module shares its name with the considerably better-known model for highly structured ring spectra due to Elmendorf, Kriz, Mandell and May.

See also 
Highly structured ring spectrum

Notes

References 

Algebraic topology